Klausbach is a small river of the Austrian state of Salzburg. It discharges from the right into the Salzach in Elsbethen.

References

Rivers of Salzburg (state)
Rivers of Austria